The Old City Cemetery in Jacksonville, Florida was established in 1852 as Jacksonville's main burial ground. After the American Civil War the cemetery later interred many Confederate veterans and veterans of the Union Army’s United States Colored Troops. Because the cemetery is over 160 years old, the Jacksonville Historic Landmarks Commission has deemed it an historic landmark of Jacksonville.  The United Daughters of the Confederacy improved the cemetery by placing a historical plaque for the cemetery in 1949 and then a wall at the entrance of the cemetery in 1954.

Notable burials
Notable individuals buried at the cemetery include:
 Byron Kilbourn (1801–1870), surveyor, railroad executive, business magnate and politician who was an important figure in the founding of Milwaukee, Wisconsin and the city's third and eighth mayor
 Captain Jacob Brock (1810–1876),  steamboat captain operating on the St. Johns River
 Joseph Finnegan (1814–1885), brigadier general of the Confederate States Army
 John Freeman Young (1820–1885), second bishop of the Episcopal Diocese of Florida, renown for his translation of Christmas carol Silent Night, Holy Night (German: Stille Nacht, heilige Nacht)  from German to English
 Francis P. Fleming (1841–1908), 15th Governor of Florida
 John Claudius “Claude” L'Engle (1868–1919),  Democratic Representative from Florida to the Sixty-third Congress
 Dr. Alexander H. Darnes (1846–1894), the first African-American physician in Jacksonville and the second in the state
 Laura Adorkor "Mother Kofi" Kofi (1893–1928), founder of the African Universal Church
 Alice Nunn (1927–1988), actress, remembered for her role as "Large Marge" in Pee Wee's Big Adventure.

Decay and vandalism
Despite being one of the oldest and most historical cemeteries in Jacksonville it has been neglected and in decay. Due to the increased downtown urbanization around the cemetery and poor security it has endured vandalism over the years. Some gravestones have been damaged or simply toppled over in certain areas of the cemetery.

Gallery

Notes

References

External links
 
 Florida Times-Union
 Florida Public Archaeology Network

Geography of Jacksonville, Florida
Cemeteries in Florida
American Civil War sites
1852 establishments in Florida